77th NBR Awards
January 10, 2006

Best Film: 
 Good Night, and Good Luck. 
The 77th National Board of Review Awards, honoring the best in film for 2005, were given on 10 January 2006.

Top 10 films
Good Night, and Good Luck.
Brokeback Mountain
Capote
Crash 
A History of Violence
Match Point
Memoirs of a Geisha
Munich
Syriana
Walk the Line

Top Foreign Films
Paradise Now
2046
Balzac and the Little Chinese Seamstress
Downfall (Der Untergang)
Walk on Water

Top Five Documentaries
March of the Penguins
Ballets Russes
Grizzly Man
Mad Hot Ballroom
Murderball

Winners
Best Film: 
Good Night, and Good Luck.
Best Foreign Language Film: 
Paradise Now
Best Actor: 
Philip Seymour Hoffman - Capote
Best Actress: 
Felicity Huffman - Transamerica
Best Supporting Actor: 
Jake Gyllenhaal - Brokeback Mountain
Best Supporting Actress: 
Gong Li - Memoirs of a Geisha
Best Acting by an Ensemble: 
Mrs Henderson Presents
Breakthrough Performance Actor:
Terrence Howard - Crash, Get Rich or Die Tryin' and Hustle & Flow
Breakthrough Performance Actress:
Q'Orianka Kilcher, The New World
Best Director: 
Ang Lee - Brokeback Mountain
Best Directorial Debut:
Julian Fellowes, Separate Lies
Best Documentary Feature: 
March of the Penguins
Best Animated Feature: 
Corpse Bride
Best Screenplay - Adapted: 
Syriana - Stephen Gaghan
Best Screenplay - Original: 
The Squid and the Whale - Noah Baumbach
Best Film or Mini-Series Made for Cable TV:
Lackawanna Blues
Career Achievement Award:
Jane Fonda
Billy Wilder Award for Excellence in Directing:
David Cronenberg
Career Achievement - Music Composition:
Howard Shore
Outstanding Achievement in Special Effects: 
King Kong
William K. Everson Award for Film History:
George Feltenstein
Special Achievement in Producing:
Saul Zaentz
Special Recognition of Films That Reflect Freedom of Expression:
Innocent Voices
The Untold Story of Emmett Louis Till
Special Recognition For Excellence In Filmmaking:
Breakfast on Pluto
Cape of Good Hope
The Dying Gaul
Everything Is Illuminated
Hustle & Flow
Junebug
Layer Cake
Lord of War
Nine Lives
The Thing About My Folks
The Upside of Anger

External links
National Board of Review of Motion Pictures :: Awards for 2005

2005
2005 film awards
2005 in American cinema